Phototype can refer to a metal printing block, sometimes prepared using photogravure to reproduce a photograph in printing.  The block may be a halftone image.
 Phototype can also refer to type set using a phototypesetting process to prepare pages for photo lithography. This process replaced hot metal typesetting. It was commonly used in the late nineteenth century (for book illustration), and through the 1970s and 1980s, and was in turn rapidly rendered obsolete by modern systems which employ a raster image processor to render an entire page to a single high-resolution digital image which is then photoset.
 Skin phototype depends on the amount of melanin pigment in the skin.  It is assessed on a scale from 1 to 6. See Fitzpatrick scale for more details.

Photographic processes